Giacometti is an Italian language surname derived from the name Giacomo.

The surname may refer to:

 Alberto Giacometti (1901, Borgonovo, Stampa - 1966), a Swiss sculptor, painter, draughtsman, and printmaker
 Augusto Giacometti (1877–1947), a Swiss painter; 2nd cousin of Giovanni Giacometti
 Bruno Giacometti (1907, Stampa - 2012), a Swiss architect; The brother of Alberto and Diego Giacometti
 Diego Giacometti (1902, Borgonovo - 1985), a Swiss sculptor and designer; The younger brother of Alberto Giacometti
 Zaccaria Giacometti (1893-1970), a Swiss professor of constitutional law; the cousin of Alberto, Diego and Bruno Giacometti
 Giovanni Giacometti (1868–1933), a Swiss painter; the father of Alberto, Diego, and Bruno Giacometti
 John Giacometti (1936, in Italy - 2006), an Italian-Australian association football player
 Michel Giacometti (1929, Ajaccio – 1990), a French ethnomusicologist
 Paolo Giacometti (1816, Novi Ligure - 1882), an Italian dramatist
 Roney "Giah" Giacometti (born 1975), a Brazilian composer, singer and guitarist

Italian-language surnames
Patronymic surnames
Surnames from given names